Francis Huxley (28 August 1923 – 29 October 2016) was a British botanist, anthropologist and author. He is a son of Julian Huxley. His brother was Anthony Julian Huxley. His uncle was Aldous Huxley.

He was one of the founders of Survival International.

Works 
 Affable Savages: An Anthropologist Among the Urubu Indians of Brazil. Viking, New York, 1957, 
 The Invisibles: Voodoo Gods in Haiti. Rupert Hart-Davis, London, 1966
 The Way Of The Sacred. Doubleday, New York, 1974
Shamans Through Time: 500 Years on the Path to Knowledge, New York 2001, edited by Jeremy Narby and Francis Huxley 
The Raven and the Writing Desk, an exploration of the writings of Lewis Carroll, in the Alice books, Harper & Row, New York, 1976

References

External links 
 Biography 
 WorldCat

1923 births
2016 deaths
British botanists
British anthropologists
Francis
People educated at Gordonstoun